The Murguma Dam is constructed on the Saharajhore River, one of the tributary of Kangsabati River in West Bengal, India. The dam is constructed near Murguma village in the foothill of Ajodhya Hills, Purulia District. It's under Kotshila Police Station. A number of other streams also flow into the dam directly from Ajodhya Hills. The dam is surrounded by hills, forests and a number of small islands within it. The place is situated at the north west end of Ajodhya Hills which is considered as an eastern extension of Chota Nagpur Plateau.

People and economy
The area is basically inhabited by tribal people, mainly Santal people. The economy is mainly dependent on agriculture. However, the place has a good potentiality to be a popular tourist spot which can improve economic condition of the local people. The government is promoting this place as a tourist destination. This dam is a part of one of the key small irrigation projects in rural as well as arid areas of West Bengal having a considerable percentage of tribal population. 
It is one of the promising tourist spots of Eastern Chota Nagpur Plateau region.  Till date, no facility of boating offered. The dam and surroundings are preferred locations for backpackers. The dam features in the tourism brochure of Government Tourist Department of Purulia District.

Accessibility
The nearest railway station is Jhalda, from where the place is accessible by single metaled road. The other option is to follow the Purulia-Tamna more-Arsha-Begunkodor-Murguma(50 km) route. The accessibility is somehow not so good but that is perhaps one of the reasons that the place still offers wild beauty.  

Distance from nearby places: 
Ajodhya Hills Top = 20 km,
Jhalda = 16 km,
Begunkodor town = 6 km,
Begunkodar rail FH = 12 km,
Kolkata = 340 km,
Purulia = 50 km,
Durgapur = 185 km (via Bankura) 165 km (via Asansol),
Bankura = 140 km,
Jamshedpur = 110 km,
Ranchi = 95 km,
Asansol = 134 km,

Miscellaneous
Being far from urban disturbance, this dam is a location for research on indigenous aquatic flora and fauna. 
This area was affected by Maoist insurgency a few years back but now returned to normalcy.

Gallery

References

Dams in West Bengal
Year of establishment missing
Purulia district
Tourist attractions in Purulia district